The Coliseum of Itagüí (in Spanish Coliseo Cubierto de Itagüí) is a multi-use coliseum in Itagüí city, Colombia.  It is currently used mostly for Futsal matches, on club level by Itagüí. The coliseum has a capacity of 5,000 spectators.

See also

 Itagüí

References

External links
 
 Talento Dorado de Itagüí

Itagüí
Buildings and structures in Antioquia Department
Sports venues in Colombia